John Barber (1734–1793) was an English coal viewer and inventor.  He was born in Nottinghamshire, but moved to Warwickshire in the 1760s to manage collieries in the Nuneaton area. For a time he lived in Camp Hill House, between Hartshill and Nuneaton, and later lived in Attleborough. He patented several inventions between 1766 and 1792, of which the most remarkable was one for a gas turbine. Although nothing practical came out of this patent, Barber was the first man to describe in detail the principle of the gas turbine, and in recent years a working model based on Barber's specification has been built.

Barber's gas turbine

In 1791 Barber took out a patent (UK patent no. 1833 – Obtaining and Applying Motive Power, & c. A Method of Rising Inflammable Air for the Purposes of Procuring Motion, and Facilitating Metallurgical Operations) which contained all of the important features of a successful gas turbine. Planned as a method of propelling a "horseless carriage", Barber's design included a chain-driven, reciprocating gas compressor, a combustion chamber, and a turbine.

Barber's turbine was used to burn gas obtained from wood, coal, oil, or other substances, heated in a retort or producer, from where the gases were conveyed into a receiver and cooled. Air and gas were then to be compressed in different cylinders and pumped into an "exploder" (combustion chamber) where they were ignited, the mixture of hot gas then being played against the vanes of a paddle wheel. Water was to be injected into the explosive mixture to cool the mouth of the chamber and, by producing steam, to increase the volume of the charge.

Barber's concept was sound, but given the technology of that day, it was not possible for the device to create sufficient power to both compress the air and the gas and produce useful work.  Nevertheless, the credit for the idea that leads to the modern gas turbine can clearly be given to John Barber. In 1972 the Bonn firm Kraftwerk-Union AG showed a working model of Barber's turbine at the Hannover Fair.

Legacy 
Sir Frank Whittle in England patented 1930 a design for a gas turbine for jet propulsion. The first successful use of this engine was in April, 1937. His early work on the theory of gas propulsion was based on the contributions of most of the earlier pioneers of this field including John Barber.

See also
History of the internal combustion engine

References 

 H. S. Torrens, 'Barber, John (1734–1793)’, Oxford Dictionary of National Biography, Oxford University Press, 2004 Retrieved 29 July 2016
  
 

English engineers
British coal miners
People from Nuneaton
1734 births
1801 deaths